Khaled Ba Wazir (Arabic:خالد با وزير) (born 8 May 1995) is an Emirati soccer player. He currently plays for Al-Sharjah.

External links

References

Emirati footballers
1995 births
Living people
Al Wahda FC players
Al-Wasl F.C. players
Al Dhafra FC players
Sharjah FC players
UAE Pro League players
Association football midfielders